The 1952–53 British Home Championship was a football tournament played between the British Home Nations throughout the 1952–53 season. The tournament saw a last minute goal by Lawrie Reilly in the final game at Wembley which salvaged a draw and thus a share in the trophy for Scotland. England were the other winners whilst both Wales and Ireland played well in a very competitive competition.

England began with a draw against a combative Irish team in a game which finished 2–2. The Scots however were able to narrowly beat Wales in Cardiff, taking the lead after the first round. In the second games, Scotland and Ireland played another score draw, keeping both sides tournament hopes alive, albeit behind England, who comprehensively beat Wales in their game. The final matches saw a battling Wales side defeat the Irish in Belfast, ending Ireland's lively hopes for the trophy and gaining some pride in the two points necessary to match Ireland. England and Scotland played out the final match knowing that the winner would take the trophy, but that a draw would share it between them as goal difference was not yet used to determine position. A very hotly contested game looked to be going England's way until the 90th minute when Reilly's late goal, his second of the game, gave half the trophy to Scotland.

Table

Results

References

1951
1952–53 in Northern Ireland association football
1952–53 in English football
1952–53 in Scottish football
1952–53 in Welsh football
1952 in British sport
1953 in British sport